The 2008 Grand National Party Convention is a political scandal in the South Korean politics that exposed higher-level political corruption within the ranks of the Lee Myung-bak government. The connections surrounding the Lee Myung-bak government has also affected the performance of the Grand National Party. A GNP lawmaker, Koh Seung-duk, was instrumental of exposing it by reporting his knowledge about the corruption incident to the Seoul Central District Prosecutors’ Office.

Development of the Investigation
At first, the SPO raided the house of a former aide to Park Hee-tae, Koh Myung-jin. Later, the SPO has also detained the key campaigner to Park Hee-tae, Ahn Byung-yong, for delivering money to other party members during the 2008 legislative election.

See also
 Corruption in South Korea
 DDoS attacks during the October 2011 South Korean by-election
 Prime Minister's Office Civilian Surveillance Incident
 Lee Myung-bak government

References

External links
 Widening bribery scandal engulfs political parties before polls

Corruption in South Korea
Lee Myung-bak Government
Liberty Korea Party
Grand National Party Convention Bribery Incident
Grand National Party Convention Bribery Incident
Bribery scandals
Political scandals in South Korea
2008 scandals